The Greater Penobscot Building, commonly known as the Penobscot Building, is a class-A office tower in Downtown Detroit, Michigan. Constructed in 1928, the Art Deco building is located in the heart of the Detroit Financial District. The Penobscot is a hub for the city's wireless Internet zone and fiber-optic network.

Height

Upon completion, the Penobscot Building was the eighth-tallest building in the world, the fourth-tallest in the United States and the tallest outside of New York and Chicago. Rising , the 47-story Penobscot was the tallest building in Michigan from its completion in 1928 until construction of the Renaissance Center hotel tower in 1977. Ally Detroit Center (formerly One Detroit Center) surpassed the Penobscot as the tallest office building in Detroit upon its completion in 1993.

The Penobscot has 45 above-ground floors and two basement levels, for a total floor count of 47. Although the Penobscot Building has more floors than Ally Detroit Center (45 above-ground floors compared to 43 for Ally Detroit Center), the floors and spires of One Detroit are taller, with its roof sitting roughly  higher than that of the Penobscot.

Name origin
The building is named for the Penobscot, a Native American tribe from Maine. Native American motifs in art deco style ornamentation is used on the exterior and the interiors. The following version of the choice of the name of the building is found in an undated publication believed to have been published concurrent with the building's dedication in 1928:
An intimation of the Simon J. Murphy Sr. family's early history, together with the expression of genuine sentiment regarding the beginnings of the Murphy fortune, is contained in the name of the Greater Penobscot Building...... Long before the Civil War days, Simon J. Murphy and his partner, then two lads who had grown up in the Maine woods obtained their first employment in one of the logging camps along the Penobscot River - a stream named for the powerful tribe of Penobscot Indians.

Architecture
The architect Wirt C. Rowland, of the prominent Smith Hinchman & Grylls firm based in Detroit, designed the Penobscot in an elaborate Art Deco style in 1928. Clad in Indiana Limestone with a granite base, it rises like a sheer cliff for thirty stories, then has a series of setbacks culminating in a red neon beacon tower. Like many of the city's other Roaring Twenties buildings, it displays Art Deco influences, including its "H" shape (designed to allow maximum sunlight into the building) and the sculptural setbacks that cause the upper floors to progressively "erode".

The opulent Penobscot is one of many buildings in Detroit that features architectural sculpture by Corrado Parducci. The ornamentation includes American Indian motifs, particularly in the entrance archway and in metalwork found in the lobby. At night, the building's upper floors are lit in floodlight fashion, topped with a red sphere.

The building's architect, Wirt C. Rowland, also designed other Detroit skyscrapers, such as the Guardian Building and the Buhl Building, in the same decade.

Penobscot Block
The tower is also connected to two older and smaller buildings, the 1905 Penobscot Building and the Penobscot Building Annex (1916). Together, the buildings comprise the Penobscot Block, located at Griswold Street and West Fort Street. The Greater Penobscot was the last portion of the complex to be developed.

Events
On holidays, both the Penobscot Building and the nearby One Woodward Avenue light-up for the night, with red, white and blue for Independence Day and Canada Day; and red, white and green for the Christmas season. In addition, during the Christmas season, the Penobscot Building's radio broadcast tower is illuminated bright gold, to resemble a giant glowing Christmas tree topped with a flashing red beacon. The Penobscot Building has become a souvenir item along with other Detroit skyscrapers.

The first televisions in Michigan were sold in the retail space on the Griswold level of this building.

For a period of time in the late 1970s and early 1980s, it was renamed the City National Bank Building, after its major tenant. When City National was acquired by another bank and renamed, the historic Penobscot name was revived.

Landmark
The Penobscot Building is a contributing property in the Detroit Financial Historic District, and on the National Register of Historic Places.

Tenants 
The Caucus Club, a restaurant known for hosting influential business officials, was located in Penobscot from 1952 until 2012. On October 4, 2012, the restaurant announced that it would close by the end of that month.  Early in her career, Barbra Streisand appeared as one of the lounge singers at the Caucus Club in 1961. Caucus Club reopened under new ownership in 2017, after an extensive renovation.
The tower apex once had "CNB" signs for a local bank that was formerly headquartered in the Penobscot Building.
For approximately 20 years ending in 2009, the building was home to radio station WJLB and its well-known 80s DJ, The Electrifying Mojo, who broadcast his nightly visits over Detroit from his 'Mothership'''. The Electrifying Mojo is credited with exposing many Detroit Techno musicians to new audiences through his broadcasts.
The Smart Detroit Conference Center occupies space on the 13th floor, and includes Class A conference, meeting, or convention space.
The Wayne County Friend of the Court occupies floors between the sub-basement and eighth floor, making it the current largest tenant of the building.

Gallery

See also

 Penobscot Block — the complex The Penobscot Building — the oldest Penobscot Building Annex — access connected Buhl Building
 Detroit Financial District
 Guardian Building
 List of tallest buildings in Detroit
 National Register of Historic Places listings in Detroit, Michigan

 References 

Further reading

 Kvaran, Einar Einarsson, Shadowing Parducci'', unpublished manuscript, Detroit.

External links
 
 Official Penobscot Building website
 Caucus Club website
 Article from the Detroit Area Art Deco Society

Art Deco skyscrapers
Downtown Detroit
Skyscraper office buildings in Detroit
Commercial buildings completed in 1928
Historic district contributing properties in Michigan
National Register of Historic Places in Detroit
Office buildings on the National Register of Historic Places in Michigan
1928 establishments in Michigan
1928 sculptures
Buildings with sculpture by Corrado Parducci
Outdoor sculptures in Michigan
1920s architecture in the United States
Art Deco hotels
Art Deco architecture in Michigan